FK Latvijas finieris is a Latvian football club located in Riga and playing in Rīgas zona of Latvian 2. līga.

Players

First-team squad

Latvijas finieris

References